Aletomeryx is an extinct genus of Artiodactyla, of the family Palaeomerycidae, endemic to North America from the early Miocene epoch (Hemingfordian stage) 20.6—16.3 Ma, existing for approximately .

Taxonomy
 
Aletomeryx was named by Lull (1920). It is the type genus of Aletomerycinae, Aletomerycini. It was assigned to Dromomerycidae by Lull (1920) and Janis and Manning (1998); and to Aletomerycini by Prothero and Liter (2007).

Fossil distribution
Fossils have been recovered from the Midway Site in Florida, Saskatchewan, Boron, California, and several sites in Nebraska and Wyoming.

References 

Palaeomerycidae
Miocene even-toed ungulates
Miocene mammals of North America
Prehistoric even-toed ungulate genera